The Girl and Death is a 2012 Dutch film directed by Jos Stelling.

Plot
The Girl and Death is a love story of Nicolai and Elise (a courtesan). Their love is obstructed by materialism, wealth, and death. The film, based on an original script by Jos Stelling and Bert Rijkelijkhuizen, tells the story of the Russian physician Nicolai, who returns to an old hotel, the place where he first met his great love half a century ago and relives his romantic tragedy.

The hotel still bears the traces of past glory. Eventually, it becomes clear why Nicolai has really returned.

Cast
Sylvia Hoeks as Elise
Leonid Bichevin as Nicolai
Sergey Makovetsky as Old Nicolai
Renata Litvinova as Nina
Dieter Hallervorden as The Count
Svetlana Svetlichnaya as Old Nina
 as The Old Actress

References

External links

Dutch romantic drama films
Films directed by Jos Stelling